Making Trouble is the debut album by the American hip-hop group the Ghetto Boys. The group originally consisted of Bushwick Bill, DJ Ready Red, Sire Jukebox and Prince Johnny C. Following the release of Making Trouble, Rap-A-Lot Records dropped Sire Jukebox and Johnny C from the group, and added Scarface and Willie D.

Making Trouble received little attention, negative reviews, and is often forgotten in the midst of the group's later successful, acclaimed and controversial albums.

Style and Influence
The group used a style of rap similar to Run-DMC at this time as opposed to the more hardcore rap style that Scarface and Willie D provided in later albums. Insane Clown Posse's Violent J, who was influenced by the Geto Boys, regards the song "Assassins" as the first horrorcore song ever recorded. It was covered by Insane Clown Posse on their 1999 album The Amazing Jeckel Brothers.

Tracklist

Personnel 
Ghetto Boys

 Prince Johnny C. – vocals, production
 The Sire Jukebox – vocals, production
 DJ Ready Red – vocals, turntables, production

Additional personnel

 Karl Stephenson – production, sampling
 Cliff Blodget – production

References

1988 debut albums
Geto Boys albums
Rap-A-Lot Records albums